Bahsahwahbee, or the Bahsahwahbee Traditional Cultural Property, in the vicinity of Major's Place in White Pine County, Nevada, is a  area listed on the National Register of Historic Places in 2017. The name stands for "sacred water valley" in native tongue.

References

National Register of Historic Places in Nevada
White Pine County, Nevada